Store Kongensgade 77 is a property on Store Kongensgade, opposite Frederik's Church, in central Copenhagen, Denmark. It was listed in the Danish registry of protected buildings and places in 1964.

History
Store Kongensgade 77 was constructed in 1832 for sugar manufacturer Christoph Hedemann (1780-). The adjacent building at No. 79 was built for Hedemann the following year.

Lawyer and politician Christian Albrecht Bluhme resided in the building from 1846 to 1849. The economist and politician Christian Georg Nathan David (1793–1874) was a resident in the building from 1858 to 1861. He headed Statistisk Bureau (now Danmarks Statistik) from 1854 to 1873. Counter Admiral Edouard Suenson (1805–1887)commemorated for his role in the Battle of Heligolandwas among the residents from 1868 to 1880. The painter Otto Bache resided in an apartment in the rear wing from 1873 to 1882 and again from 1887 to 1888. His studio was also located in the building. Another artist, Edvard Weie,  was a resident in the side wing from 1929 to 1930.

Otto Erichsen and Jacob Johan Simonsen opened a dairy shop in the building in 1878. It was from 1935 continued by O. Sørensen (born 1899) under his own name. The shop was for a while appointed as purveyor to the Court of Denmark.

Architecture
Store Kongensgade consists of four storeys over a raised cellar and is seven bays wide. An antemion friezewith alternating palmette and lotus flower decorations growing from a nest of achantus leavesruns under the windows on the first floor and the facade is finished by a dentillated cornice. The roof is clad with black tiles and features four dormer windows towards the street. A gateway topped by a fanlight with palmette decorations in the right-hand side of the building opens to a narrow courtyard. A chamfered corner bay connects the rear side of the building with a 12-bay side wing along the southern side of the courtyard. A passageway through one of the two adjoining rear wings at the other end of the courtyard opens to a second courtyard with a former stable with a tall gabled dormer.

Today
Store Kongensgade 77 is today home to the law firms Nyborg & Rørdam as well as Advokatanpartsselskabet Af 30.12.1993 with the individually practicing lawyers Hanne Rahbæk, Henriette La Cour, Henrik Fürstenberg, Jakob Grøndahl, Karin Absalonsen and Maryla Rytter Wroblewski.

Gallery

See also
 Christian Hedemann

References

Rxternal links

 Source

Listed residential buildings in Copenhagen
Residential buildings completed in 1832
1832 establishments in Denmark